Kviris Palitra is a private weekly newspaper published from Tbilisi, Georgia in the Georgian language.

References

Mass media in Tbilisi
Newspapers published in Georgia (country)